Peter Randolph may refer to:
 Peter Randolph (judge)
 Peter Randolph (minister)